Wally White (28 December 1901 – 15 December 1972) was  a former Australian rules footballer who played with Footscray in the Victorian Football League (VFL).

Notes

External links 
		

1901 births
1972 deaths
Australian rules footballers from Victoria (Australia)
Western Bulldogs players